The Goob is a 2014 British film. It was made by BBC Films and directed by Guy Myhill from his own screenplay.

Plot
"Goob" Taylor (Liam Walpole) is a school leaver with an abusive stepfather, trapped in rural poverty in Norfolk. He clashes with brutal stock car racer Gene Womack for his mother's attention and falls for a foreign field worker.

Cast
Liam Walpole
Sean Harris
Sienna Guillory
Hannah Spearritt
Marama Corlett
Paul Popplewell.

Awards and nominations

 Winner of the British Independent Film Award for Best Achievement in Production.
 Nominated for Best Supporting Actress (Sienna Guillory) and Best Newcomer (Liam Walpole) at the BIFAs.
 Winner of the Golden Hitchcock Award at the Dinard Film Festival.
 Nominated for Best British Newcomer (Guy Myhill) at the BFI London Film Festival

Locations
The Goob was filmed in Norfolk, including a disused diner at Necton and stock car racing scenes at Swaffham Raceway.

References

2014 films
BBC Film films
British drama films
Films set in Norfolk
2010s English-language films
2010s British films